The Queensland Railways A11 class locomotive was a one locomotive class of  steam locomotive operated by the Queensland Railways.

History
In 1878, the Vulcan Foundry delivered a  locomotive to the Queensland Railways Southern & Western Railway. Per Queensland Railway's classification system it designated the A11 class, A representing that it had two driving axles, and the 10 the cylinder diameter in inches.

Class list

References

Railway locomotives introduced in 1878
A11
Vulcan Foundry locomotives
2-4-0 locomotives
3 ft 6 in gauge locomotives of Australia